Aleksandr Vasilyevich Privalov (6 August 1933 – 19 May 2021) was a Soviet biathlete.
 
He received a bronze medal at the 1960 Winter Olympics in Squaw Valley. He received a silver medal at the 1964 Winter Olympics in Innsbruck.

Biathlon results
All results are sourced from the International Biathlon Union.

Olympic Games
2 medals (1 silver, 1 bronze)

World Championships
2 medals (2 silver)

*During Olympic seasons competitions are only held for those events not included in the Olympic program.
**The team (time) event was removed in 1965, whilst the relay was added in 1966.

References

External links

1933 births
2021 deaths
Skiers from Moscow
Soviet male biathletes
Biathletes at the 1960 Winter Olympics
Biathletes at the 1964 Winter Olympics
Olympic biathletes of the Soviet Union
Medalists at the 1960 Winter Olympics
Medalists at the 1964 Winter Olympics
Olympic medalists in biathlon
Olympic bronze medalists for the Soviet Union
Olympic silver medalists for the Soviet Union
Biathlon World Championships medalists
Russian male biathletes